Jonathan Miller (1934–2019) was an English physician, theatre and opera director and television presenter.

Jonathan or Jon Miller may also refer to:

Arts and entertainment
 Jon Miller (TV presenter) (1921–2008), British television presenter
 Jon Miller (television executive) (born 1956), American television executive 
 Jonny Lee Miller (born 1972), British actor
 Jonathan Miller (fl. 1993), American singer, founder of Chicago a cappella
 Jon Miller (guitarist), American musician, bassist in the band DevilDriver
 Jon de Burgh Miller, British science fiction author

Politics and law
 Jonathan Miller (abolitionist) (1797–1847), American abolitionist and politician
 Jonathan Miller (Kentucky politician) (born 1967), American politician, Secretary for the Kentucky Finance and Administration Cabinet
 Jonathan Miller (West Virginia politician) (born 1984), American politician in the West Virginia House of Delegates

Sports
 Jon Miller (born 1951), American sportscaster
 Jonathan K. Miller (1899–1971), American college football player and coach
 J. T. Miller (Jonathan T. Miller, born 1993), American NHL ice hockey player
 Jonathan Miller (footballer) (born 1998), Bahamian footballer

Others
 Jonathan Miller (businessman) (born 1957), American businessman, chairman and CEO of AOL

See also
 John Miller (disambiguation)
 Johnny Miller (disambiguation)
 Miller (name)